Saint-Maurice—Laflèche (previously known as St-Maurice—Laflèche) was a federal electoral district in Quebec, Canada, that was represented in the House of Commons of Canada from 1935 to 1968.

It was created as "St-Maurice—Laflèche" riding in 1933 from parts of Champlain and Three Rivers and St. Maurice ridings.  In 1947, the riding's English name was changed to "Saint-Maurice—Laflèche".  The electoral district was abolished in 1966 when it was redistributed into Berthier, Champlain and Saint-Maurice ridings.

Members of Parliament

This riding elected the following Members of Parliament:

Election results

St-Maurice—Laflèche, 1935–1949

Saint-Maurice—Laflèche, 1949–1968

See also 

 List of Canadian federal electoral districts
 Mauricie
 Past Canadian electoral districts

External links 
 Riding history (1933 - 1947) from the Library of Parliament
Riding history (1947 - 1966) from the Library of Parliament

Former federal electoral districts of Quebec